Love Cycle is a 2013 Telugu language romantic comedy film directed by Sapan Kumar starring Mangam Srinivas and Reshma Rathore.

Cast
 Mangam Srinivas as Gautam
 Reshma Rathore as Saranya
 Jhansi

Reception 
Karthik Pasupulate of The Times of India rated the film 1 out of 5 stars, calling it "a horrendously below par product".

References

2010s Telugu-language films